Wallace & Gromit: The Curse of the Were-Rabbit is a 2005 stop-motion animated film produced by DreamWorks Animation and Aardman Animations. It was directed by Nick Park and Steve Box (in Box's feature directorial debut) as the second feature-length film by Aardman, after Chicken Run (2000). It was the last DreamWorks Animation film to be distributed by DreamWorks Pictures, as the studio spun off as an independent studio in 2004 until its acquisition by Universal Pictures in 2016. The film premiered in Sydney, Australia on 4 September 2005, before being released in cinemas in the United States on 7 October 2005 and in the United Kingdom a week later on 14 October 2005.

The Curse of the Were-Rabbit is a parody of classic monster movies and Hammer Horror films and also serves as part of the Wallace and Gromit series, created by Park. The film centres on good-natured yet eccentric cheese-loving inventor Wallace and his intelligent quiet dog, Gromit, in their latest venture as pest control agents. They come to the rescue of their town plagued by rabbits before the annual Giant Vegetable Competition. However, the duo soon find themselves against a giant rabbit consuming the town's crops.

The film features an expanded cast of characters relative to the previous Wallace and Gromit shorts, with a voice cast including Helena Bonham Carter and Ralph Fiennes. While the film was considered a box-office disappointment in the US by DreamWorks Animation, it was more commercially successful internationally. It also received critical acclaim and won a number of film awards including the Academy Award for Best Animated Feature, making it the second and last film from DreamWorks Animation to win that award, as well as the first and to date only stop-motion film to win until Guillermo del Toro's Pinocchio (2022). In January 2022, a stand-alone sequel feature film was announced, which is due to release in 2024 on Netflix worldwide, except for the UK, where it will premiere first on the BBC before also coming to Netflix at a later date.

Plot 
As Tottington Hall's annual giant vegetable competition approaches, cheese-loving inventor Wallace and his dog Gromit provide a humane pest control business known as "Anti-Pesto," protecting people's vegetables from pests, including rabbits and keeping them in their basement. One evening, after capturing rabbits found in the garden of Lady Tottington, Wallace uses two of his latest inventions, the "Bun-Vac 6000" and "Mind Manipulation-O-Matic," to brainwash them into disliking vegetables so they can release them back into town. All goes well until Wallace accidentally sets the Bun-Vac to "BLOW," and his brain is fused with that of a rabbit, forcing Gromit to destroy the Mind-O-Matic. The transfer appears to have worked, as the rabbit shows no interest in vegetables. They name the rabbit Hutch and place him in a cage.

That night, a giant rabbit devours many people's vegetables but Wallace and Gromit do not respond. During a town meeting the next day, the vicar, Edward Clement Hedges dramatically reveals the creature to be the legendary Were-Rabbit. Hunter Victor Quartermaine offers to shoot the creature, but Lady Tottington persuades the townsfolk to give Wallace and Gromit a second chance. Wallace devises a plan to lure the rabbit out by driving around the village at night with a life-size female rabbit strapped to their van. After dislodging the rabbit by driving through a tunnel, Wallace leaves Gromit in the van to go and retrieve it. While waiting, Gromit spots the real rabbit and gives chase through the village and a giant rabbit hole but is unsuccessful. 

Gromit follows the burrow and eventually resurfaces in the morning and is shocked to find himself in his garden. He follows a set of muddy footprints leading into the house and seemingly down to the basement. Wallace concludes that Hutch must be the suspect and rushes off to tell Lady Tottington that the beast has been caught. Gromit locks Hutch in a high-security cage. Gromit then sees the trail of footprints continues past the basement, up the stairs, and into Wallace's bedroom where he finds a pile of half-eaten vegetables inside, indicating that Wallace is the real culprit.

Gromit rushes to Tottington Hall to prevent Wallace from transforming. But on their route home, they are cornered in the forest by Victor, who vies for Lady Tottington's affections and fortune. Wallace transforms into the Were-Rabbit under the full moon and flees. Now seeing the perfect chance to eliminate his rival, Victor obtains three "24-carrot" gold bullets from Hedges, to use against rabbit Wallace.

On the day of the vegetable competition, Gromit reveals to Wallace that the experiment has swapped his and Hutch's personalities; the latter is now carrying his human traits and is the only one who can fix the Mind-O-Matic. Before Hutch can finish, Lady Tottington visits and informs Wallace of Victor's plan to shoot the were-rabbit; as the moon rises, Wallace begins to transform again and hastily forces Lady Tottington to leave. Victor arrives and attempts to shoot Wallace with the golden bullets, but Gromit helps Wallace to escape by donning the female were-rabbit suit. Once Victor is gone, Gromit with help from Hutch devises a plan to save Wallace.

Wallace arrives at the competition and is nearly shot by Victor but is saved by Gromit. After running out of gold bullets, Victor takes the Golden Carrot trophy to use as ammunition. Wallace, carries Lady Tottington atop Tottington Hall and reveals his true identity to her. Meanwhile, Gromit subdues Victor's dog, Philip, in a dogfight using aeroplanes taken from a fairground attraction. Gromit then steers his plane into Victor's line of fire as he shoots at Wallace, causing the carrot to hit the plane instead. The damaged plane falls and Wallace jumps to grab Gromit, sacrificing himself to break his fall into a cheese tent. Gromit quickly disguises Victor as the female were-rabbit, causing Philip and the townspeople to chase him away.

The curse is lifted and Wallace permanently reverts to his human self; although he initially appears to have died from the fall, Gromit revives him with Stinking Bishop cheese. Lady Tottington awards Gromit the now-damaged Golden Carrot for his valor, and converts the grounds of Tottington Hall into a nature reserve for Hutch and the other rabbits.

Voice cast 

 Peter Sallis as Wallace, an eccentric, absent-minded and accident-prone yet good-natured inventor with a great fondness for cheese, who runs Anti-Pesto with his dog and best friend, Gromit.
 Sallis also provides the voice of Hutch, a kidnapped rabbit who gradually develops several of Wallace's mannerisms — his dialogue consists entirely of phrases and statements previously made by Wallace — after an attempted mind-alteration goes awry and who is at first suspected to be the Were-Rabbit. Sallis' voice was digitally accelerated to create that of Hutch's.
 Gromit is Wallace's silent, brave and highly intelligent dog who cares deeply for his master, and saves him whenever something goes wrong.
 Ralph Fiennes as Lord Victor Quartermaine, a cruel upper class bounder and a prideful hunter who is courting Lady Tottington. He wears a toupee and despises Wallace and Gromit. 
 Philip is Victor's vicious but cowardly and dimwitted hunting dog who resembles a Bull Terrier. He is too cowardly to face the Were-Rabbit so he instead targets Gromit.
 Helena Bonham Carter as Lady Campanula Tottington, a wealthy aristocratic spinster with a keen interest in vegetable horticulture and 'fluffy' animals. For 517 years, the Tottington family has hosted an annual vegetable competition on their estate on the same night. Lady Tottington asks Wallace to call her "Totty" (which is a British term for attractive women) and develops a romantic interest in him. Her forename, Campanula, is the scientific name of a bellflower, and her surname is taken from the Lancashire village of Tottington.
 Peter Kay as Police Constable Albert Mackintosh, the local village policeman who judges the Giant Vegetable Contest, though he would prefer it if the "troublemaking" competition didn't happen.
 Nicholas Smith as Reverend Clement Hedges, the superstitious town vicar and the first resident to witness the Were-Rabbit.
 Dicken Ashworth and Liz Smith as Mr. and Mrs. Mulch, neighbours of Wallace and Gromit who raise prize-winning pumpkins.
 Edward Kelsey as Mr. Growbag, an elderly resident of Wallace and Gromit's neighbourhood and a founding member of the town's vegetable growers council.
 Mark Gatiss as Ms. Blight, a resident of Wallace and Gromit's neighbourhood.
 Geraldine McEwan as Miss Thripp, an Anti-Pesto customer. McEwan reprises her role in A Matter of Loaf and Death.

Production 

In March 2000, it was officially announced that Wallace and Gromit were to star in their own feature film. It would have been Aardman's next film after The Tortoise and the Hare, which was subsequently abandoned by the studio in July 2001, owing to script problems.

The directors, Nick Park and Steve Box, have often referred to the film as the world's "first vegetarian horror film". Peter Sallis (the voice of Wallace) is joined in the film by Ralph Fiennes (as Lord Victor Quartermaine), Helena Bonham Carter (as Lady Campanula Tottington), Peter Kay (as PC Mackintosh), Nicholas Smith (as Rev. Clement Hedges), and Liz Smith (as Mrs. Mulch). As established in the preceding short films, Gromit is a silent character, communicating purely via body language.

The film was originally going to be called Wallace & Gromit: The Great Vegetable Plot, but the title was changed, as the market research disliked it. The first reported release date for The Great Vegetable Plot was November 2004. Production officially began in September 2003, and the film was then set for release on 30 September 2005. In July 2003, Entertainment Weekly referred to the film as Wallace & Gromit: The Curse of the Were-Rabbit.

Park said that after separate test screenings with British and American audiences, including children, he adjusted the characters' speech for American audiences. Park was often sent notes from DreamWorks, which stressed him. He recalled one note that Wallace's car should be trendier, which he disagreed with because he felt making things look old-fashioned made it look more ironic.

The vehicle Wallace drives in the film is an Austin A35 van. In collaboration with Aardman in the spring of 2005, a road going replica of the model was created by brothers Mark and David Armé, founders of the International Austin A30/A35 Register, for promotional purposes. In a 500-man-hour customisation, an original 1964 van received a full body restoration, before being dented and distressed to perfectly replicate the model van used in the film. The official colour of the van is Preston Green, named in honour of Nick Park's home town. The name was chosen by the art director and Mark Armé.

Release 
The film had its worldwide premiere on 4 September 2005, in Sydney, Australia. It was theatrically released in the United States on 7 October 2005, and in United Kingdom and Hong Kong the following week. The DVD edition of the film was released on 7 February 2006 (United States) and 20 February 2006 (United Kingdom).

Home media 
In Region 2, the film was released in a two-disc special edition that includes Cracking Contraptions, plus a number of other extras. In Region 1, the film was released on DVD in widescreen and full-screen versions and VHS on 7 February 2006. Walmart stores carried a special version with an additional DVD, "Gromit's Tail-Waggin' DVD" which included the test shorts made for this production, making of the Were-Rabbit creature, memorable moments of the film titled "Gromit's Favorite Scenes", a video showing the legacy of the "Wallace and Gromit" franchise, an instructional video on how to draw Gromit, as well as "Cracking Contraptions" shorts.

A companion game, also titled Curse of the Were-Rabbit, had a coinciding release with the film. A novelization, Wallace and Gromit: The Curse of the Were-Rabbit: The Movie Novelization by Penny Worms, was also produced.

It was the last DreamWorks Animation film to be released on VHS. It was re-released on DVD on 13 May 2014 as part of a triple film set, along with fellow Aardman/DreamWorks films Chicken Run and Flushed Away.

A Blu-ray edition of the film was released by Universal Pictures Home Entertainment in the United States on 4 June 2019.

Reception

Box office 
Wallace & Gromit: The Curse of the Were-Rabbit opened in 3,645 cinemas and had an opening weekend gross of $16 million, putting it at number one for that weekend. During its second weekend it came in at number two, just $200,000 behind The Fog. It remained number one worldwide for three weeks in a row. The Curse of the Were-Rabbit grossed $192.6 million at the box office, of which $56.1 million was from the United States. , it is the second-highest-grossing stop-motion animated film of all time behind Aardman’s first film, Chicken Run.

Critical response 
The website's critical consensus reads, "The Curse of the Were-Rabbit is a subtly touching and wonderfully eccentric adventure featuring Wallace and Gromit." On Metacritic, the film received a weighted average score of 87 out of 100, based on 38 critics, indicating "universal acclaim." Audiences polled by CinemaScore gave the film an average grade of "B+" on an A+ to F scale.

In 2016, Empire magazine ranked it 51st on their list of the 100 best British films, with their entry stating, "The sparkling Curse Of The Were-Rabbit positively brims with ideas and energy, dazzling movie fans with sly references to everything from Hammer horrors and The Incredible Hulk to King Kong and Top Gun, and bounds along like a hound in a hurry. The plot pitches the famously taciturn Dogwarts' alumnus and his Wensleydale-chomping owner (Sallis) against the dastardly Victor Quartermaine (Fiennes), taking mutating bunnies, prize-winning marrows and the posh-as-biscuits Lady Tottington (Bonham Carter) along for the ride. In short, it's the most marvellously English animation there is."

Accolades

Soundtrack

Aftermath 
After the box-office failure of Flushed Away resulted in a major write down for DreamWorks, it was reported on 3 October 2006 and confirmed on 30 January 2007 that DreamWorks had terminated their partnership with Aardman. In revealing the losses related to Flushed Away, DreamWorks also revealed they had taken a $29 million write down over Wallace & Gromit as well, and the film under performed expectations despite grossing $192 million against a budget of only $30 million.

Following the split, Aardman retained complete ownership of the film, while DreamWorks Animation retained worldwide distribution rights in perpetuity, excluding some United Kingdom television rights and ancillary markets. Soon after the end of the agreement, Aardman announced that they would proceed with another Wallace & Gromit project, later revealed to be a return to their earlier short films with A Matter of Loaf and Death for BBC One.

During production of the short, Park remarked publicly on difficulties with working with DreamWorks during the production of The Curse of the Were-Rabbit, such as the constant production notes and demands to alter the material to appeal more to American children. This discouraged him from producing another feature film for years, with Lord noting that Park preferred the “half hour format”. However, in January 2022, a new Wallace & Gromit film was announced, which is due to release in 2024 on Netflix worldwide, except for the UK, where it will first premiere on BBC before coming to Netflix at a later date.

Notes

References

External links 

  
 The Curse of the Were-Rabbit at the Official Wallace & Gromit website
 
 
 
 

Wallace and Gromit films
2005 films
2005 animated films
2005 comedy films
2000s action comedy films
2000s fantasy comedy films
2000s comedy mystery films
2000s monster movies
Aardman Animations films
2000s American animated films
2000s British animated films
American buddy comedy films
American children's animated comedy films
American children's animated fantasy films
American comedy mystery films
Animated buddy films
Animated films about rabbits and hares
Films about shapeshifting
Annie Award winners
Best Animated Feature Annie Award winners
Best Animated Feature Academy Award winners
Best Animated Feature Broadcast Film Critics Association Award winners
Best British Film BAFTA Award winners
British buddy films
British children's animated films
British children's comedy films
British children's fantasy films
British fantasy comedy films
British comedy mystery films
DreamWorks Pictures films
Clay animation films
American fantasy comedy films
Films directed by Nick Park
Films produced by Peter Lord
Films produced by Nick Park
Films set in Lancashire
Children's horror films
British horror films
British supernatural horror films
American supernatural horror films
Films with screenplays by Bob Baker (scriptwriter)
Films with screenplays by Nick Park
DreamWorks Animation animated films
2000s children's comedy films
2000s stop-motion animated films
2005 directorial debut films
Vegetarian-related mass media
Films set in England
2000s English-language films
2000s British films